John Eugene Osborne (June 19, 1858 – April 24, 1943) was an American physician, farmer, banker, and politician who served as the 3rd governor of Wyoming and United States representative as a member of the Democratic Party.

Early life

John Eugene Osborne was born on June 19, 1858, although his passport stated that he was born on June 19, 1860, in Westport, New York to John C. Osborne and Mary E. Rail. In 1874 Osborne moved to Burlington, Vermont where he worked at a drug store and studied medicine at the University of Vermont College of Medicine where he graduated in 1880. Later that year he moved to Rawlins in the Wyoming Territory where he established a drug store. In 1881 he was hired as an assistant surgeon by the Union Pacific Railroad.

Big Nose George Parrott

Following the botched hanging and subsequent execution of George Parrott, also known as Big Nose George, in 1881,

Lillian Heath was 16 when she received the skull cap of Big Nose George, and went on to become the first female physician in  Wyoming.

Career

Early politics

In 1883, Osborne was elected to Wyoming's House of the Territorial Assembly, but resigned in 1885, when he left the Territory for a brief period. In 1888, he was appointed chairman of the Penitentiary Building Commission and also elected mayor of Rawlins. During the 1880s, Osborne was a physician and chemist in Rawlins, and operated a farm, at one point being the largest individual sheep owner in Wyoming. After the lynching of Big Nose George Parrott, Osborne helped conduct the autopsy, and had Parrot's skin tanned and made into a pair of shoes he later allegedly wore at his inauguration as governor.

Governor and House

Osborne was an alternate delegate to the Democratic National Convention in 1892. In July 1892, Osborne was given the Democratic nomination for governor at the state convention on the 37th ballot although he had removed his name from consideration before being convinced to put it back up. In the general election he defeated Edward Ivinson with 9,290 votes to 7,509 votes.

On January 2, 1893, Osborne was inaugurated, wearing the shoes he had made from Big Nose George's skin, although he had attempted to take office earlier on December 2, 1892, which was ruled as invalid and premature by the Wyoming Supreme Court on January 17. He was unable to attend Grover Cleveland's presidential inauguration as he was afraid that Secretary of State Amos W. Barber would appoint a Republican during the time that he would server as acting governor in Osborne's absence. During his tenure he fought with the state legislature which was divided with 22 Republicans, 21 Democrats, and 5 Populists. He completed his term on January 7, 1895, having declined renomination.

From March 4, 1897 until March 3, 1899, he served in the 55th United States Congress as the U.S. representative from Wyoming, but again declined renomination when his term expired.

Later life

Osborne was a free silver supporter and during the 1896, 1900, and 1908 presidential elections he supported William Jennings Bryan. In 1896 he served as chairman of the Wyoming delegation to the Democratic National Convention, in 1898 he served as vice chairman of the Democratic National Committee, was made a member of the national committee in 1900, and served as the vice chairman of the finance committee in 1908. During the 1904 presidential election Bryan suggested that somebody like Osborne from the western United States should run for the Democratic nomination, but Osborne chose not to run.

On April 28, 1903, Governor DeForest Richards died in office shortly after winning reelection in 1902 resulting in a special election. Osborne won the Democratic nomination by acclamation, but was defeated in a landslide in the special election by Bryant Butler Brooks.

On November 2, 1907, he married Selina Smith of Princeton, Kentucky after they met on the island of Madeira when Jean Curtis Smith was on a round-the-world trip with her sister and brother-in-law. According to an account in the Passenger-Inquirer of Owensboro, Kentucky, "they were engaged to be married when they landed on American soil two months later." Their honeymoon was interrupted "when his efforts to secure the 1908 Democratic National Convention for the West met with success and they were obliged to hurry to [Denver," where it was to be held. Mrs. Osborne was known as the "official hostess" for the convention.

In 1910, he served as chairman of the Wyoming Democratic Party. Osborne was appointed Assistant Secretary of State by President Woodrow Wilson and served in his administration from  April 21, 1913 until December 14, 1915. He was also chairman of the board of the Rawlins National Bank, and engaged in stock raising. In 1913, he suggested that the remains of Christopher Columbus should be placed on a battleship and travel through the Panama Canal as a part of its opening ceremony. During the 1936 presidential election he was selected as one of the three Democratic presidential electors for Wyoming and vote for Franklin D. Roosevelt and John Nance Garner when the electoral college convened.

Osborne was a Freemason and a member of the York Rite. On March 2, 1942, his wife died in Louisville, Kentucky. On April 24, 1943, Osborne died in Rawlins, Wyoming at age 84 after suffering a heart attack earlier in the week. He was interred at the Smith family plot at Cedar Hill Cemetery in Princeton, Kentucky.

Electoral history

References

External links
John E. Osborne (D), Wyoming state archives
The Hanging of Dutch Charley and Big Nose George, the election of John E. Osborne, Wyoming Tales and Trails
"An Outlaw's Skin Was Made Into Shoes — Should they be on display?", by Eric Grundhauser, Atlas Obscura, December 19, 2017. Retrieved May 9, 2018.
National Governors Association
Biographical Directory of the United States Congress

govtrack.us
Wyoming State Historical Society

1858 births
1943 deaths
19th-century American physicians
19th-century American politicians
20th-century American politicians
American people of English descent
American people of Canadian descent
Democratic Party members of the United States House of Representatives from Wyoming
Democratic Party governors of Wyoming
Mayors of places in Wyoming
Members of the Wyoming Territorial Legislature
People from Westport, New York
Physicians from Wyoming
United States Assistant Secretaries of State
University of Vermont alumni